Doleromyrma is a genus of ants in the subfamily Dolichoderinae. The genus is native to Australia, where the ants nest in soil, or under stones or logs.

Species
 Doleromyrma darwiniana (Forel, 1907) – native to Australia, and introduced to New Zealand
Doleromyrma darwiniana fida (Forel, 1907)
Doleromyrma darwiniana leae (Forel, 1913)
 Doleromyrma rottnestensis (Wheeler, 1934)

References

External links

Dolichoderinae
Ant genera
Hymenoptera of Australia